Groves is a surname. Notable people with the surname include:

 The Groves family, a British theatre family
 Andrew Groves, British fashion designer
 Anthony Norris Groves, British missionary
 Cady Groves (1989-2020), American singer-songwriter
 Charles Groves, British actor
 Charles Groves, British conductor
 Colin Groves (1942–2017), Australian primatologist
 Cornelia Groves, American preservationist (1926–2021)
 Don Groves, Australian journalist for IF Magazine
 Eddy Groves, Australian businessman
 Fred Groves, British actor
 Frederick Groves (disambiguation)
 George Groves (boxer), English boxer
 Harold Groves (1897-1969), American politician
 Herbert Stanley "Bert" Groves, Aboriginal Australian activist in the Aboriginal-Australian Fellowship and Aborigines Progressive Association
 Herta Groves, British hat designer
 James Grimble Groves (1854–1914), British brewer and politician
 Jennifer Choe Groves, American Federal Judge
 John Groves (disambiguation)
 Junius George Groves (1859-1925), American farmer and businessman
 Ken Groves (1921–2002), English footballer
 Kristina Groves (b. 1976), Canadian speed skater
 Leslie Groves (1896–1970), American general who managed the Manhattan Project
 Martin Groves, British hillclimb driver
 Mike Groves, Cricketer
 Naomi Jackson Groves (1910-2001), Canadian painter and linguist
 Paul Groves (footballer) (b. 1966), English footballer
 Paul Groves (tenor) (b. 1964), American opera singer
 Perry Groves (b. 1965), English footballer
 Ricky Groves (b. 1968), British actor
 Robert Groves, British Royal Navy and Royal Air Force officer
 Ronald Groves, English educationalist and academic
 Sara Groves, American singer-songwriter
 Shaun Groves, American singer-songwriter
 Stephen W. Groves, American naval flyer
 Vic Groves, English footballer
 Walter Groves (1856-1906), British comedian
 William P. Groves (1893-1963), American politician
 Willie Groves, Scottish footballer
 Tori Groves-Little (born 2000), Australian rules footballer

See also
 Grove (disambiguation)

English-language surnames

de:Groves
fr:Groves
it:Groves
ja:グローヴズ
pl:Groves
pt:Groves